Ecuador participated in the 2010 Summer Youth Olympics in Singapore.

The Ecuador squad consisted of 14 athletes competing in 8 sports: aquatics (swimming), athletics, boxing, table tennis, tennis, triathlon, weightlifting and wrestling.

Medalists

Athletics

Boys
Track and Road Events

Girls
Track and Road Events

Boxing

Boys

Swimming

Table tennis

Individual

Team

Tennis

Singles

Doubles

Triathlon

Girls

Men's

Mixed

Weightlifting

Wrestling

Freestyle

Greco-Roman

References

External links
Competitors List: Ecuador

2010 in Ecuadorian sport
Nations at the 2010 Summer Youth Olympics
Ecuador at the Youth Olympics